John Alexander "Jack" Forrest (24 February 1924 – 26 February 2016) was a New Zealand rugby league footballer who represented New Zealand in 12 international matches between 1947 and 1952. His cousin Jonas Masters also played rugby league for New Zealand.

Playing career
Forrest played in the West Coast Rugby League competition for Runanga and represented both the West Coast and the South Island.

He played in 42 matches, 12 of which were test matches, for the New Zealand national rugby league team, including matches against the 1951 touring French side and on the 1951-52 tour of Great Britain and France.

Later years
Forrest also represented New Zealand in clay pigeon shooting.

He died in Greymouth on 26 February 2016.

References

1924 births
2016 deaths
New Zealand rugby league players
New Zealand national rugby league team players
West Coast rugby league team players
Rugby league wingers
South Island rugby league team players
Runanga players
New Zealand male sport shooters